Beadell is a surname. Notable people with the surname include:

 Len Beadell (1923–1995), Australian surveyor and road builder
 Robert Beadell (1925–1994), American classical composer

See also 
 3161 Beadell, a main-belt asteroid
 Mount Beadell, a mountain of Western Australia